West Town Mall is a shopping mall located in Knoxville, Tennessee, United States. Opened in August 1972, this one-level mall is located in the western portion of Knoxville in the West Hills community. West Town Mall is located along Interstates 40/75 and Kingston Pike. The mall has  of gross leasable area, making it the largest of any enclosed shopping mall in Tennessee. The anchor stores are Dillard's, Dick's House of Sport, 2 Belk stores, JCPenney, and Cinebarre.

There is a food court in the center of the mall. This was the original location of a junior anchor Frankenbergers Department Store. This food court was the first mall location for Knoxville-based Petro's Chili & Chips.

On October 15, 2018, it was announced that Sears would be closing as part of a plan to close 142 stores nationwide. The store closed on January 6, 2019, and demolition began on January 9, 2020 Subsequent to the demolition, it was replaced by Dick's House of Sport, a new concept by Dick's Sporting Goods.

Movie theaters 
In 1998, Knoxville based Regal Entertainment Group opened a Funscape entertainment complex in the mall. In 2018, the Regal Cinemas was rebranded to Cinebarre.

Anchors 
 JCPenney (current location) (opened in 1994 as part of an expansion)
 Dillard's (opened in 1972 as Miller's, became Hess's in 1987 and closed in 1992 and expanded and became Dillard's in 1993)
 Belk (opened in 1972 as Proffitt's, expanded in 1995 and became Belk in 2006)
 Belk Men's, Children's and Home (opened in 1994 as Parisian in a pad originally slated to be Parks-Belk as part of an expansion, became Belk Men's, Children's and Home in 2007)
Dick's House of Sport (opened in 1972 as Sears, demolished in 2020 and then rebuilt as Dick's House of Sport which opened in 2020 as well.

Former anchors 
 JCPenney (original location) (opened in 1972, relocated in 1994, lower level became more mall space, while the upper level became Regal Cinemas in 1998, became Cinebarre in 2018)
 Frankenbergers (now the food court)
 Sears (opened in 1972, closed in 2019, demolished in 2020)

References

External links 
 

Shopping malls in Tennessee
Shopping malls established in 1972
Buildings and structures in Knoxville, Tennessee
Simon Property Group
Economy of Knoxville, Tennessee
Tourist attractions in Knoxville, Tennessee
1972 establishments in Tennessee